The 2014–15 Gonzaga Bulldogs men's basketball team represented Gonzaga University in the 2014–15 NCAA Division I men's basketball season. The team was led by head coach Mark Few, who was in his 16th season as head coach. The team played its home games at McCarthey Athletic Center, which has a capacity of 6,000. The Bulldogs (also informally referred to as the Zags) were playing in their 35th season as a member of the West Coast Conference. The Zags were predicted to finish atop of the conference by the West Coast Conference Preseason Poll. The Zags finished in first place in the West Coast Conference Standings for the 18th time with a 17-1 conference record after BYU defeated the Zags in the regular season finale, snapping the nation's longest active home winning streak of 41 games, as well as Gonzaga's school record 22-game winning streak. The Bulldogs then went on to beat BYU in the West Coast Conference tournament, and claimed their 14th WCC tournament title, along with punching their 18th ticket to the NCAA Tournament. Gonzaga entered the 2015 NCAA tournament as a #2 seed in the South region, and dismantled #15 seed North Dakota State, #7 seed Iowa, and #11 seed UCLA, to gain its second trip to the Elite Eight, as well as Mark Few's first as head coach. The Zags then fell to #1 seed (and eventual national champion) Duke, and finished the season with a 35–3 record, which were the most wins in school history.

Previous season

The 2013-14 Gonzaga Bulldogs team were predicted to finish atop of the conference by the West Coast Conference Preseason Poll. The Zags finished in first place in the West Coast Conference Standings for the 17th time with a 15-3 conference record. The Bulldogs then went on to beat BYU in the West Coast Conference tournament, and claimed their 13th WCC tournament title, along with punching their 17th ticket to the NCAA Tournament. The team drew an eight seed in the 2014 NCAA tournament, where they outlasted ninth-seed Oklahoma State in the round of 64, 85-77, but then lost to Arizona in the round of 32, 84-61. The Zags finished the season with an overall record of 29-7, including a perfect 15-0 record at home.

Preseason

Departures

Incoming transfers

2014 recruiting class

2015 recruiting class

Roster

 Ryan Edwards has elected to redshirt the 2014-15 season and will have 3 years of eligibility remaining effective in 2015-16.
 Bryan Alberts has elected to redshirt the 2014-15 season and will have 4 years of eligibility remaining effective in 2015-16.
 Josh Perkins suffered a broken jaw in a November 2014 game and received a medical redshirt. He was finally cleared to play with full contact in late April 2015.
 Angel Nunez won an appeal to grant him one final year of eligibility after the 2014-15 season.

Rankings

Schedule
Gonzaga's non-conference schedule included home games against SMU, Memphis, Texas Southern, Sacramento State, and Southeastern Louisiana. Gonzaga played true road games at Arizona and UCLA, and also faced off with Washington State at the Spokane Arena. The Zags were invited to be a host in the NIT Season Tip-Off, where they hosted Saint Joseph's and St. Thomas Aquinas and then traveled to Madison Square Garden in New York to play Georgia and ultimately St. John's in the championship game. Gonzaga also played in the 12th annual Battle in Seattle at KeyArena against Cal Poly. Gonzaga played 18 conference games (home-and-home) during the season.

|-
!colspan=12 style="background:#002965; color:white;"| Exhibition

|-
!colspan=12 style="background:#002965; color:white;"| Regular Season

|-
!colspan=12 style="background:#002965; color:white;"| WCC Tournament

|-
!colspan=12 style="background:#002965; color:white;"| NCAA tournament

See also
2014–15 Gonzaga Bulldogs women's basketball team
2014–15 West Coast Conference men's basketball season

References

Gonzaga Bulldogs men's basketball seasons
Gonzaga
Gonzaga
Gonzaga Bulldogs men's basketball
Gonzaga Bulldogs men's basketball